The discography of British girl-group Stooshe consists of one studio album, one mixtape, eight singles (including one promotional track and one as a featured artist) and ten music videos. The group released their debut single, "Love Me" featuring Travie McCoy, in March 2012; where it debuted at number five on the UK chart. A second single, "Black Heart", was released in June 2012; peaking at number three. In November 2012, the group released "Waterfalls", a cover version of the TLC song of the same name. Stooshe released "Slip" on 12 May, shortly before their debut studio album London with the Lights On on 27 May. The fourth single from the album, "My Man Music", was released on 28 July 2013.
The upcoming second album, with the lead single being "Lock Down" released 15 January 2016. "Let It Go" is the name of the second official single, and was released 1 July 2016.

Albums

Studio albums

Mixtapes

Singles

As lead artists

As featured artist

Promotional singles

Music videos

See also
List of songs recorded by Stooshe

References

Footnotes

Sources

External links

[ Discography of Stooshe] at AllMusic

Discographies of British artists